There are around 118 villages

 in Karjat taluka in the Ahmednagar district of state of Maharashtra. Following are the list of villages in Karjat taluka.

A

 Akhani
 Akhoni
 Alsunde (Marimata)
 Ambijalgav

B

 Babhulgaon Khalsa
 Bahirobawadi
 Bajrangwadi
 Baradgaon Dagadi
 Baradgaon Sudrik
 Belgaon kanadi
 Belwandi
 Benwadi
 Berdi
 Bhambora
 Bhose
 Bitakewadi

C

 Chande Bk
 Chande Kd
 Chakhalewadi
 Chapadgaon
 Chilawadi
 Chincholi Kaldat
 Chincholi Ramjan

D

 Demanwadi
 Deshmukhwadi
 Dhalwadi
 Dighi
 Dixal
 Dombalwadi
 Dudhodi
 Durgaon

G

 Ganeshwadi
 Ghumari
 Goykarwadi
 Gundachiwadi
 Gurau Pimpri

H
 Hanumanbet

K

 Kalyachiwadi
 Kangudwadi
 Karjat
 Karpadi
 Kaudane
 Khandala
 Khandavi
 Khatagaon
 Khed
 Khidhanwadi
 Khurangewadi
 Kokangaon
 Kombhali
 Kopardi
 Koregaon
 Kuldharan
 Kumbhefal

L

 Loni Masadepur

M

 Mahalungi
 Mahi
 Malthan
 Mandali omkar Leman 
 Manewadi
 Mirajagaon
 Mulewadi

N

 Nagalwadi
 Nagamthan
 Nagapur
 Nandgaon
 Nawasarwadi
 Nimbhe
 Nimbodi
 Nimgaon Daku
 Nimgaon Ganagarda

P
Pimpalwadi

Patewadi

R

 Rakshaswadi Bk
 Rakshswadi Kd
 Rashin
 Ratanjan
 Rawalgaon
 Rehekuri
 Ruigavan

S

 Shegud
 Shimpora
 Shinde (Shinda)
 Siddhatek
 Sonalwadi

T

 Taju
 Takali Khandeshweri
 Talwadi
 Tambe Vadi
 Taradgaon
 Thergaon
 Therwadi Gadade Nagar
 Thikhi
 Torkadwadi
thane

W

 Wadgaun Tanpure
 Waghnali
 Walwad

See also

 Karjat tehsil
 Tehsils in Ahmednagar
 Villages in Akole tehsil
 Villages in Jamkhed tehsil
 Villages in Kopargaon tehsil
 Villages in Nagar tehsil
 Villages in Nevasa tehsil
 Villages in Parner tehsil
 Villages in Pathardi tehsil
 Villages in Rahata tehsil
 Villages in Rahuri tehsil
 Villages in Sangamner tehsil
 Villages in Shevgaon tehsil
 Villages in Shrigonda tehsil
 Villages in Shrirampur tehsil

References

 
Karjat